Far och flyg is a 1955 Swedish film directed by Gösta Bernhard and starring Dirch Passer.

Cast
 Dirch Passer - Peder
 Åke Grönberg - Hagfors
 Irene Söderblom - Agneta Jansson
 Georg Adelly - Albin
 Rut Holm - Mrs. Hermansson
 Arne Källerud - Dröm
 Curt Åström - Åkerlind
 Sven Holmberg - Pilot at restaurant
 Stig Johanson - Prof. Schmultz
 Gunnar Lindkvist - Lindström
 Sven Lykke - Passenger / Gangster in Peder's dream
 John Melin - Saint Peter in Peder's dream
 Gösta Bernhard - Professor Edvardsson - archeologist (uncredited)
 Curt Randelli - Matilda's parrot (voice) (uncredited)
 Ib Schønberg - Autograph hunter (uncredited)

References

External links

1950s Swedish-language films
Swedish black-and-white films
Films directed by Gösta Bernhard
Swedish comedy films
1955 comedy films
1950s Swedish films